85th and Manchester "Three Trails" Trail Segment is a historic Santa Fe Trail segment located at Kansas City, Jackson County, Missouri. The segment may have been on the route of the original Santa Fe trading expedition led by William Becknell in 1821.

It was added to the National Register of Historic Places in 2012.

References

Santa Fe Trail
Roads on the National Register of Historic Places in Missouri
Buildings and structures in Kansas City, Missouri
National Register of Historic Places in Kansas City, Missouri